George Abeyagoonasekera (born  22 January 1915) was a Ceylonese politician. He was the member of Parliament of Sri Lanka from Hanguranketha representing the United National Party. He was defeated in the by P. B. Unantenne in the 1970 general election. He was married to Rose Dagmar Seneviratne.

References

1915 births
Year of death missing
Members of the 5th Parliament of Ceylon
Members of the 8th Parliament of Sri Lanka
United National Party politicians